Tristan Nunez (born October 31, 1995 in Boynton Beach, Florida) is an American racing driver from in Boca Raton, Florida. He is the son of Juan Nunez, a former professional tennis player and coach. Nunez has a fraternal twin brother, Dylan, who was a globally ranked junior tennis player, and is now an aspiring actor.

Nunez began his racing career in the Skip Barber Summer Series in 2011 where he won the championship. In 2012 he was the 2012 Cooper Tires Prototype Lites champion and won the Team USA Scholarship to compete in the Formula Ford Festival. In 2013, he became the youngest class winner in Rolex Sports Car Series history, driving a Speedsource Mazda6 in the GX class. Driving with Charlie Shears and David Heinemeier Hansson, he finished 11th in the American Le Mans Series' 2013 12 Hours of Sebring where he competes in the LeMans Prototype Challenge class for Performance Tech Motorsports.

For 2014, Nunez was signed as a Mazda factory driver in the United SportsCar Championship.

For 2015, Nunez factory driver for Mazda Motorsports / SpeedSource in the Mazda SKYACTIV diesel prototype.

Racing record

Complete WeatherTech SportsCar Championship

References

External links
Tristan Nunez on Driver Database
Tristan Nunez Racing

1995 births
Racing drivers from Florida
Racing drivers from Miami
American Le Mans Series drivers
Rolex Sports Car Series drivers
24 Hours of Daytona drivers
Sportspeople from Boynton Beach, Florida
Living people
WeatherTech SportsCar Championship drivers

Multimatic Motorsports drivers
Team Joest drivers
Action Express Racing drivers
Michelin Pilot Challenge drivers
Le Mans Cup drivers